High Heath may refer to:
High Heath, Shropshire, England
High Heath, West Midlands, England